Everton is an electoral district of the Legislative Assembly in the Australian state of Queensland.

The division encompasses suburbs in Brisbane's north west between Kedron Brook and the South Pine River, including Everton Park, Everton Hills, McDowall and Albany Creek. Parts of Mitchelton are located in the electorate.

Members for Everton

Election results

References

External links
 

Everton